Delmar Stadium is a 12,000-seat stadium located at 1900 Mangum Road in Houston, Texas, United States.  It is primarily used for American football games of Houston Independent School District schools.  It is a part of the Delmar-Tusa Sports complex includes a 5,000-seat basketball/volleyball arena, Delmar Fieldhouse, a 6,000-seat rugby/football/soccer/track venue, Dyer Stadium, a 3,000-seat football/soccer field, Delmar Jr. Field, and a 1,500-seat baseball stadium, Absher Field.

Delmar Stadium was constructed in 1959 for just under $12.9 million. After severe flooding in May 2015 rendered the field unsuitable for play, artificial turf was installed later that year.

In 1974, the Minnesota Vikings used Delmar Stadium as their practice facility in preparation for Super Bowl VIII, which was played at Rice Stadium.

Delmar was also the primary home field of the Texas Southern University Tigers football team in 2008, following Hurricane Ike. Texas Southern played three games there during the 2008 season, including a rivalry game against Grambling State University on November 20.

On March 13, 2010, Delmar Stadium hosted the third annual Space City Classic high school senior all-star football game.  Organizers intend to keep the Space City Classic at Delmar in the future.
 
On July 22, 2011, Trae Day, in honor of rapper Trae Tha Truth, was hosted for its 4th year.

The stadium was used as a filming site in the 1998 movie Rushmore, for the scene where Max is flying a kite and meets Margaret.

In 2019, the Houston Sabercats, returned to play a professional rugby game at the stadium when the pitch at their new purpose built rugby stadium was not deemed playable following their soft opening.

See also
Delmar Fieldhouse
Trae

References

External links
Delmar Stadium facility details

Houston Independent School District
Sports venues in Houston
American football venues in Houston
Houston SaberCats stadiums
Defunct college football venues
High school football venues in Texas
1957 establishments in Texas
Sports venues completed in 1957